Thomas Robert Mann (born 1947) is an American jewelry artist known primarily for his metalsmithing and assemblage techniques. Combining industrial-style metals with found trinkets and baubles, Mann has dubbed his style "Techno-Romantic" and runs Studio I/O in New Orleans, Louisiana, where he now lives and works.

Early life and education 
Mann was born in Northampton, Pennsylvania and raised in Allentown, Pennsylvania. His father was a machinist for Bethlehem Steel, an influence to which Mann credits his "fondness for machinery." While in high school, Mann experimented with jewelry-making and worked at a silversmith shop in Allentown. The jewelry he sold during his teen years helped fund his education at East Stroudsburg University, where he earned a degree in performing arts in 1970. In 1977, Mann began exhibiting at the New Orleans Jazz & Heritage Festival and later established his home and studio in New Orleans in 1982.

Selected collections 

Museum of Fine Arts, Houston
Museum of Fine Arts, Boston
Smithsonian American Art Museum

References

Living people
1947 births
American jewellers
People from Northampton, Pennsylvania
Artists from Allentown, Pennsylvania
Artists from New Orleans
East Stroudsburg University of Pennsylvania alumni